The Po Leung Kuk Museum, or Po Leung Kuk Archives is a museum and an archive housed in the Main Building of Po Leung Kuk's Headquarters, located at 66 Leighton Road, Causeway Bay, Hong Kong.

The museum consists of the Old Hall, the Exhibition Hall, the Archives Office, the Research Room and two Archival Conservation Rooms. The Old Hall and the Exhibition Hall are opened to the public.

The museum stores the historical documents of Po Leung Kuk. They will also be available upon request for the public to read.

See also
 List of museums in Hong Kong

Po Leung Kuk
Causeway Bay
History museums in Hong Kong